Eckley Miners' Village in eastern Pennsylvania is an anthracite coal mining patch town located in Foster Township, Pennsylvania. Since 1970, Eckley has been owned and operated as a museum by the Pennsylvania Historical and Museum Commission.

History

Early years
Before the 1850s, Eckley was not a mining town, but a rural, forested community called Shingletown. It was located on land owned by the Tench Coxe Estate. The inhabitants took advantage of the surrounding woodlands and made shingles to be sold in White Haven and Hazleton. These goods were traded for the necessities of life, such as "whiskey, port, and tobacco".

Coal
In 1853, four prospectors came to Shingletown and found that the land contained several veins of coal. Within the year these four men, Richard Sharpe, Asa Lansford Foster, Francis Weiss and John Leisenring, formed Sharpe, Leisenring and Company, later known as Sharpe, Weiss, and Company.  Judge Charles Coxe of Philadelphia, executor of the Tench Coxe Estate, granted the company a 20-year lease for the establishment and operation of a colliery on these . In 1854 the company began work on this, the Council Ridge Colliery.

By autumn of 1854, the company had constructed a saw mill to provide lumber necessary for the colliery buildings, such as the breaker, stable, and store house. They also began building a village to house the colliery workers. The scattered forest dwellings of the residents of Shingletown were quickly replaced by two rows of red wooden frame houses with black trim. This new village was called Fillmore, presumably in honor of President Millard Fillmore who left office in 1853. Several years later, the company applied for a post office for their town and learned that a town in Centre County had already appropriated the name. As a result, the town was renamed Eckley in 1857 in honor of Judge Coxe's eldest son, Eckley B. Coxe who was then 17 years old. In later years, Eckley Coxe, an engineer, became involved in the operations in the town of his name.

European Immigrants
The first residents of Eckley were mostly English and Welsh immigrants who came from the mines in Great Britain. There also were Germans living in the village who were brought to the colliery as engineers.

By the late 1850s and early 1860s, these colliers were joined by groups of Irish farmers who had immigrated to America after the devastating Great Famine in their homeland. The Irish were generally unskilled in the field of mining and so received the lowest-skilled, lowest-paying jobs. Over time, the Irish learned the skills of mining and moved into better-paying, higher-skilled jobs. By the time of the 1880s and 1890s, the low-skill jobs were being taken by the new wave of immigrants from Eastern and Southern Europe. These groups included peoples from Slovakia, Poland, Ukraine, Lithuania, and Italy. Once again, the new immigrants took many years to develop the knowledge and skills to move into the higher-skilled positions in the colliery.

Many of these immigrants came to America expecting to work in the mines just long enough to save money, buy land, and return to the farming lifestyle they had known in Europe. Once they became part of the company-owned system, however, very few were able to escape the years of poverty and hardship that faced them.

Museum
The site is now run as a museum with an indoor and outdoor component by the Pennsylvania Historical and Museum Commission.  Buildings that are part of the museum include: the Immaculate Conception Church (1861), three "slate pickers houses" (1854), larger laborers' dwellings (1854), St. James Episcopal Church (1859), mine boss's houses (1860), the doctor's office (1874), and the Sharpe House (1861).

Molly Maguires

Film
The Molly Maguires, a 1970 film, was filmed in Eckley in 1969. The wooden "coal breaker" featured heavily in the film was built as a prop.  It received little or no maintenance over the years and, even though it has been called a "tinderbox", still stands. The company store was also built as a prop for the movie and still exists today.

The filming of this movie resulted in the town's being saved from demolition, and was afterward turned into a mining museum under the control of the Pennsylvania Historical and Museum Commission.

Town geography
Traveling east to west down Main Street the houses become larger toward the end of town. Like most industrial companies of the 19th century, Sharpe, Weiss and Company planned the village with the occupation and rent paying abilities of their workers in mind. In Eckley, the mine owners lived at the western end of town. The original company store, mule barn, hotel and doctor's office were also located there.

Mine foremen and their families rented the single dwellings located just east of the downtown. First class miners, those men with experience in mining, were assigned the -story double houses in the middle of the village. These were larger than the -story double dwellings rented to their assistants or laborers.

See also

Coal Region
anthracite coal
Pennsylvania Historical and Museum Commission
The Molly Maguires (film)

References

Further reading
 Dewees, Francis P. The Molly Maguires: The Origin, Growth, and Character of the Organization (1877; 1964)

External links

Eckley Miners' Village official site

Open-air museums in Pennsylvania
Unincorporated communities in Pennsylvania
Museums in Luzerne County, Pennsylvania
Historic districts on the National Register of Historic Places in Pennsylvania
Anthracite Coal Region of Pennsylvania
Mining museums in Pennsylvania
Company towns in Pennsylvania
Houses in Luzerne County, Pennsylvania
Gothic Revival architecture in Pennsylvania
Museums established in 1970
National Register of Historic Places in Luzerne County, Pennsylvania